Betrayal, Justice, Revenge is the second studio album by the Finnish symphonic/folk metal band Kivimetsän Druidi. It was released in 2010 on Century Media.

Track listing
 "Lament for the Fallen" - 02:01
 "Aesis Lilim" - 05:57
 "Seawitch and the Sorcerer" - 04:55
 "The Visitor" - 04:01
 "Manalan Vartija" - 03:13
 "Tuoppein'nostelulaulu" - 04:57
 "Chant of the Winged One" - 06:03
 "Of Betrayal" - 06:33
 "Desolation: White Wolf" - 06:13
 "Veljet" - 04:15 (special edition bonus track)
 "Where Hope and Daylight Die" - 06:10 (Summoning cover) (special edition bonus track)

Personnel
Leeni-Maria Hovila - vocals
Joni Koskinen - guitars, vocals
Antti Koskinen - keyboards
Antti Rinkinen - guitars
Simo Lehtonen - bass
Atte Marttinen - drums, orchestration

Kivimetsän Druidi albums
Century Media Records albums
2010 albums